Elizabeth Weeks Leonard is an American lawyer, who is currently the J. Alton Hosch Professor at University of Georgia.

References

Year of birth missing (living people)
Living people
University of Georgia faculty
American lawyers
Place of birth missing (living people)